Martin Norton (born c. 1902) was a player in the National Football League. He first played for the Minneapolis Marines during the 1922 NFL season. After a season away from the NFL, he re-joined the Marines for the 1924 NFL season. The next season, he played with the Green Bay Packers. He was also a member of the team for the next three seasons, but did not see any playing time during the season.

Norton was captain of the football, basketball and tennis teams while he attended Central High School in Minneapolis (class of 1921). He coached the Minneapolis Globe Trotters basketball team in the 1920s. In 1925, he was named the coach of the basketball team at Ripon College. He was also an assistant coach to Carl Doehling on Ripon's football team. Norton also played on the Minneapolis Whiz Bangs basketball team (also serving as captain), a basketball team from Appleton, Wisconsin, a football team from Ironwood, Michigan, and the Muscatine Muskies basketball team.

References 

 Profile at pro-football-reference.com

Year of birth missing
Year of death missing
Minneapolis Marines players
Green Bay Packers players
Hamline Pipers football players
Players of American football from Minnesota
Date of birth unknown
Date of death unknown